Pierre de Voyer d'Argenson, Vicomte de Mouzay (1625 – probably in 1709) was the French governor of New France from 1658 to 1661.

Biography
He was a son of the diplomat René de Voyer de Paulmy d'Argenson. He came of a noble family of Touraine, and although originally intended for the church, distinguished himself in several military engagements. He received his commission as governor of Canada on 27 January 1657, arriving in Quebec in 1658. Under his administration, Canada was occupied in repelling incursions from the Iroquois, and was torn by internal quarrels. He made some progress in exploring the region on Hudson Bay and beyond Lake Superior.

Notes

References
 

Argenson, Vicomte d'
1625 births
1709 deaths
17th-century Canadian politicians